Rock Valley is a city in Sioux County, Iowa, the North Western corner of Iowa, United States, along the Rock River. The population was 4,059 at the time of the 2020 census.

Geography
Rock Valley is located at  (43.201624, -96.296379).

Rock Valley is located on U.S. Route 18.

History 
The town of Rock Valley was platted in 1879 by a Colonel Ira Warren, a Civil War veteran, and the Chicago Milwaukee & St. Paul Railway on ground owned by Warren.

Economy

In February 2022,  a methane digester of Winding Meadows Dairy near Rock Valley owned by Gevo spilled manure which flowed across frozen fields into Lizard Creek (Iowa), a tributary of the Rock River. Eventually it was found 376,414 gallons of liquid manure spilled into waterways and Gevo had no license to operate the digester. The Iowa Department of Natural Resources fined the dairy farmer $10,000 for the spill, but not Gevo.

Notable people
Florence Fallgatter, home economist, was born in Rock Valley.
James Francis Macbride, botanist, was born in Rock Valley.
Stephen A. Mitchell (politician), was born in Rock Valley.
Richard Mulder (1938-2022), physician and Minnesota state legislator was born in Rock Valley.
Katy Olson, politician, was born in Rock Valley.
Andrew Van Ginkel, football player, was born in Rock Valley

Demographics

2010 census
As of the census of 2010, there were 3,354 people, 1,283 households, and 870 families living in the city. The racial makeup of the city was 92.2% White, 0.3% African American, 0.4% Asian, 5.8% from other races, and 1.2% from two or more races. Hispanic or Latino of any race were 12.2% of the population.

There were 1,283 households, of which 32.9% had children under the age of 18 living with them, 60.9% were married couples living together, 4.2% had a female householder with no husband present, 2.7% had a male householder with no wife present, and 32.2% were non-families. 28.8% of all households were made up of individuals, and 13.5% had someone living alone who was 65 years of age or older. The average household size was 2.54 and the average family size was 3.16.

The median age in the city was 35.8 years. 27.3% of residents were under the age of 18; 8.1% were between the ages of 18 and 24; 25.3% were from 25 to 44; 19.4% were from 45 to 64; and 19.9% were 65 years of age or older. The gender makeup of the city was 49.4% male and 50.6% female.

2000 census
As of the census of 2000, there were 2,702 people, 1,124 households, and 750 families living in the city. The racial makeup of the city was 98.48% White, 0.11% African American, 0.07% Native American, 0.33% Asian, 0.59% from other races, and 0.41% from two or more races. Hispanic or Latino of any race were 1.04% of the population.

There were 1,124 households, out of which 29.4% had children under the age of 18 living with them, 59.8% were married couples living together, 5.2% had a female householder with no husband present, and 33.2% were non-families. 30.9% of all households were made up of individuals, and 16.5% had someone living alone who was 65 years of age or older. The average household size was 2.38 and the average family size was 3.00.

In the city, the population was spread out, with 25.4% under the age of 18, 9.6% from 18 to 24, 24.4% from 25 to 44, 18.3% from 45 to 64, and 22.3% who were 65 years of age or older. The median age was 38 years. For every 100 females, there were 92.6 males. For every 100 females age 18 and over, there were 89.8 males.

The median income for a household in the city was $36,967, and the median income for a family was $45,074. Males had a median income of $31,219 versus $20,833 for females. The per capita income for the city was $19,660. About 1.9% of families and 4.1% of the population were below the poverty line, including 6.7% of those under age 18 and 3.2% of those age 65 or over.

External links
  Rock Valley webpage
 http://www.cityofrockvalley.com/site/rivers-bend

References

Cities in Sioux County, Iowa
Cities in Iowa